Erbessa continens is a moth of the family Notodontidae first described by Louis Beethoven Prout in 1918. It is found in Ecuador, Peru, Bolivia and Brazil.

References

"Erbessa continens, holotype, dorsal". Discover Life.

Moths described in 1918
Notodontidae of South America